Dennis Engelman (born 8 February 1995) is a German footballer who currently plays for Bonner SC.

Career
Until 2014, Engelman played for the youth squad of Bayer Leverkusen. In the 2013–14 season he participated in the first season of the UEFA Youth League. He played in five of the six group games, where Leverkusen were eliminated. Furthermore, he played during this season with the second team of the club a game in the Regionalliga West. Engelman made his debut during the 3–0 victory against SG Wattenscheid 09, playing all 90 minutes. In the summer of 2014, Engelman moved to 3. Liga side Fortuna Köln. He made his debut on 6 August 2014, in a 2–0 win against Hallescher FC, coming on as a substitute in the 70th minute for Jan-André Sievers.

National team
Engelman played six games for the under-15 and under-16 sides of the Germany national team. He scored the final goal of the game in a 2–3 defeat on 13 May 2010 against the Poland under-15s.

References

External links
 

German footballers
Germany youth international footballers
Association football midfielders
Bayer 04 Leverkusen II players
SC Fortuna Köln players
Regionalliga players
3. Liga players
1995 births
Living people